Black Patti may refer to:
Black Patti Records, a short-lived record label
Matilda Sissieretta Joyner Jones, an African-American soprano nicknamed the "Black Patti"